Cytosolic phospholipase A2 gamma is an enzyme that in humans is encoded by the PLA2G4C gene.

References

Further reading